Lego Ninjago: Master of the 4th Dimension is a 4-D animated short film attraction based on the Ninjago television series. It was released in Legoland California Resort on 12 January 2018 and then rolled out to other Legoland parks and Legoland Discovery Centres in 2018. The film has a runtime of 12 minutes and uses a variety of sensory effects to enhance the experience. The plot focuses on the events that take place when Master Wu prepares the ninja for the teachings of the "Scroll of the 4th Dimension". The film was produced by Pure Imagination Studios and distributed by The Lego Group.

Plot 
The plot focuses on a lesson on perspective given by Master Wu to the ninja. After showing off their individual elemental powers to the audience in the dojo, the ninja are scolded by Master Wu, who warns them about being proud. Master Wu then proceeds to teach the ninja a lesson about how time is experienced differently based on perception. He presents the "Scroll of the Fourth Dimension", which holds great power, and then offers a demonstration. Master Wu explains that with the knowledge of the scroll, a spinjitzu master can manipulate time and space. When Master Wu asks the ninja to once again demonstrate their elemental powers, he uses the scroll to freeze them in time and afterwards explains that only the most disciplined ninja can use the scroll. When Master Wu leaves the ninja to their training, he forgets to take the scroll with him. The ninja race to retrieve it and Lloyd reaches it first. When he attempts the second lesson on the scroll, it affects gravity and he loses his grip on the scroll. After their efforts to move around the dojo to reach the scroll fail, the ninja decide to combine their elemental powers and Jay finally reaches it. When he uses the scroll, it affects organised matter, and the ninja discover that they can no longer use their elemental powers. Nya picks up the scroll, realises that they must change their perspective, and turns the scroll upside down. After she uses the scroll, the dojo is returned to its original state. Master Wu then returns for the scroll and the ninja show off their airjitzu abilities to the audience.

Cast 

 Michael Adamthwaite as Jay
 Paul Dobson as Master Wu
 Kelly Metzger as Nya
 Brent Miller as Zane
 Kirby Morrow as Cole
 Vincent Tong as Kai
 Sam Vincent as Lloyd

4D effects 
Viewers are provided with 3D glasses to experience the visual effects. The film incorporates 4D sensory effects during its 12-minute run time to enhance the viewing experience. These include music, sound effects, lasers, smoke, water and strobe lighting effects.

Production 
Lego Ninjago: Master of the 4th Dimension was produced by Pure Imagination Studios and The Lego Group. The story was created by Michael D. Black, who also directed.

Distribution 
Lego Ninjago: Master of the 4th Dimension was released in Legoland California Resort on 12 January 2018 and then rolled out to other Legoland Parks and Legoland Discovery Centres in 2018. It is currently located in all Legoland parks and Legoland Discovery Centres and is available at scheduled times alongside other short films, including The Lego Movie: 4D – A New Adventure and Lego City 4D - Officer in Pursuit.

See also 

 Lego Ninjago
 Ninjago (TV series)
 List of Ninjago episodes
 The Lego Movie: 4D – A New Adventure
Lego City 4D - Officer in Pursuit
List of Lego films and TV series

References

External links 

 Ninjago Master of the 4th Dimension at Legoland Windsor Resort

Legoland
Lego Ninjago
Amusement rides introduced in 2018
Amusement park films
4D films